Eta (Η, η) is the seventh letter of the Greek alphabet

Eta or ETA may also refer to:

People
 Eta (given name)
 Eta, a derogatory term for the Burakumin in the Japanese feudal era
 ETA, an Elvis Tribute Artist

Aircraft
 Eta (glider), a German glider
 CNA Eta, an Italian aircraft

Brands and enterprises
 Eta, a snack food brand owned by Griffin's Foods
 Empresa de Transporte Aéreo, a defunct Brazilian Airline
 Environmental Transport Association, a British roadside assistance company
 ETA SA, a Swiss watchmaking company
 ETA Star Group, a Dubai-based investment company
 ETA Systems, a defunct American computer manufacturer
 ETA a.s., a Czech electrical appliances manufacturer

Education 
 Engineering & Technologies Academy, in San Antonio, Texas, United States
 Ethiopian Teachers' Association, a trade union
 Evangelical Theological Academy, in Zwijndrecht, Netherlands
 Evangelical Theological Association, a former teaching institute in Melbourne, Australia

Government and politics 
 ETA (separatist group), a Basque armed separatist group
 Electronic Travel Authorization or Electronic Travel Authority, an alternative to a travel visa required by many countries for entry 
 Employment and Training Administration, of the United States Department of Labor
 European Technical Assessment of the European Organisation for Technical Approvals

Mathematics 
 Dedekind eta function
 Dirichlet eta function
 Eta conversion
 Eta invariant
 Weierstrass eta function
 The small letter eta is used as 't Hooft symbol

Science and technology 
 Eicosatetraenoic acid
 Eta meson
 Ethanolamine
 Event tree analysis
 Exfoliatin
 Hapticity
 Pseudorapidity
 Reproduction factor, in the nuclear engineering four factor formula
 Viscosity
 Entropy as defined in Boltzmann's H-theorem
 SARS-CoV-2 Eta variant, one of the variants of SARS-CoV-2, the virus that causes COVID-19

Music
 "E.T.A.", a song by Justin Bieber from the album Changes, 2020
 "ETA", a song by Dr. Dre, Snoop Dogg, Busta Rhymes and Anderson .Paak from The Contract EP, 2022

Other uses
 Estimated time of arrival
 England Touch Association, the national governing body for touch rugby within England
 Hurricane Eta, a damaging and deadly Category 4 hurricane that occurred in the 2020 Atlantic hurricane season
 'eta, a letter or glottal stop in the Tahitian languages
 Electronics Technicians Association, a professional association
 Landolphia owariensis, a vine native to Africa and sometimes known as eta
 Edited To Add, used on blogs and other internet posts.

See also
 Eta Island (disambiguation)